Vladimir Shkurikhin (26 July 1958 – 25 November 2017) was a Russian volleyball player who competed for the Soviet Union in the 1988 Summer Olympics.

In 1988 he was part of the Soviet team which won the silver medal in the Olympic tournament. He played in all seven matches.

References

External links
 profile

1958 births
2017 deaths
Russian men's volleyball players
Soviet men's volleyball players
Olympic volleyball players of the Soviet Union
Volleyball players at the 1988 Summer Olympics
Olympic silver medalists for the Soviet Union
Olympic medalists in volleyball
Sportspeople from Izhevsk
Medalists at the 1988 Summer Olympics
Competitors at the 1986 Goodwill Games
Goodwill Games medalists in volleyball